Ground is the second album by the Nels Cline Trio. Initially it was to be a 7", but reviewing the demos Krown Pocket director Brian Rosser suggested an album.

Track listing
 "Cropped"
 "A Sudden Interest"
 "Beer Bottle Collection"
 "Tent City"
 "The Divine Homegirl"
 "Rumpus Room / Rift (Live Boot)"
 "Ribbed"
 "Stela for Jefferson"

Personnel
 Nels Cline - Guitar
 Bob Mair - Bass Guitar
 Michael Preussner - Drum Set

Nels Cline Trio albums
1995 albums